Tsitongambarika is a lowland forest in the north of Fort-Dauphin, village Iabakoho, Anosy in southern Madagascar. The area supports many rare species of amphibians, birds, lemurs and reptiles; many of which are endemic. In 2001, the site was designated as an Important Bird Area by BirdLife International and in 2015, an area of 600 km² received environmental protection by the government. The reserve is the recipient of monies raised by the 2016 Rutland Birdfairin.

Geography
The forest is in the south of the island of Madagascar, within the Tsitongambarika massif, which consists of a series of ridges aligned from south-west to north-east. On the western boundary the Manampanihy river flows northwards. The nearest town is Tôlanaro, 9 km to the south. Tsitongambarika is the only area in the south of the country that still has significant areas of lowland forest but, due to illegal logging and shifting cultivation, deforestation rates are amongst the highest in the country. An area farmed under shifting cultivation is cleared and, for a few years cultivated, than abandoned and lies fallow while fertility returns. Local people are also affected, as they depend on the forest for firewood and charcoal, and are often portrayed as the villains of tropical deforestation. As long as their needs are considered, and as long as they participate in decisions and benefit from management, they can be the best conservationists. The forest forms the water catchment of rivers and steams that are of importance for the cultivation of rice on the coastal plain.

The area was assessed by BirdLife International to be an Important Bird Area in 2001 and since 2005, Asity Madagascar have been working with local communities to manage the area. An area of  received government protection in 2015. Despite legal protection Birdlife International considers the forest to be an 'IBA in Danger'.

Much and most of the wildlife is important to Madagascar and many of the amphibians and reptiles are likely to be new to science. Botanical collecting in the 2000s found at least seventy new species. The reserve supports areas of intact low- and mid-altitude, dense, humid evergreen forest, and sclerophyllous montane forest. At low altitudes the canopy is at 15 m to 25 m and dominated by Dracaena, Ilex, Oncostemum, Sorindeia, Syzygium and Tambourissa. At mid-altitudes the canopy is 12 m to 20 m high with trees of Macaranga and Oncostemon, as well as species of Guttiferae, Monimiaceae, Moraceae and Myrtaceae.

The forest on Mount Ivohibe (677m) (more than one on the island with the same name) is an isolated peak with a relatively undisturbed forest. An expedition, organised by the Royal Botanic Gardens, Kew in 2010 recorded twenty species of palms making it one of the richest sites, for palms, in the southern part of the island. Sixteen species are either rare or threatened species according to IUCN redlist data. Expedition members considered the forest on Ivohibe to be a 'site of major palm significance'.

The brown mesite (Mesitornis unicolor) is a ground-dwelling bird of undisturbed primary, evergreen, humid forest and its population is thought to be declining rapidly. It is listed as vulnerable due its habitat along the eastern seaboard of Madagascar being fragmented. Other key species include Madagascar blue-pigeon (Alectroenas madagascariensis), Madagascar wood-rail (Mentocrex kioloides), nelicourvi weaver (Ploceus nelicourvi), nuthatch vanga (Hypositta corallirostris), red-fronted coua (Coua reynaudii), scaly ground-roller (Geobiastes squamiger), spectacled tetraka (Bernieria zosterop)  and white-throated oxylabes (Oxylabes madagascariensis).

See also
 Rainforests of the Atsinanana

References

External links
 Asity Madagascar

Important Bird Areas of Madagascar
Protected areas of Madagascar
Madagascar lowland forests